The Government by the People Act or H.R. 20 is proposed United States campaign finance reform legislation introduced in 2014. , it had over 100 Democratic cosponsors, but at the time, it was thought to have little chance of passing the Republican-controlled House of Representatives. 

Under the provisions of the act, political contributions of up to $150 would be matched by a factor of six times more than the original donation as long as candidates meet certain requirements. They must not use their own money, not accept donations over $1000, have  already received at least $50,000 from 1000 in-state donors, and decline most political action committee money. In order to subsidize donations to political candidates, supporters say it will close "corporate tax loopholes", though MinnPost.com said no financing mechanism has been identified. It has been supported in print by Representatives Nancy Pelosi (D-CA), John Sarbanes (D-MD), Annie Kuster (D-NH), and Tulsi Gabbard (D-HI).

See also 

 For the People Act of 2019, which incorporates many of this bill's provisions

References

External links
Official bill

Proposed legislation of the 113th United States Congress
Campaign finance reform in the United States